Mary Kay Zuravleff (born 1960) is an American short story writer and novelist.

Life
She was born in Syracuse, New York.
She graduated from Rice University, and from Johns Hopkins University.

She taught at Johns Hopkins University, Goucher College, the University of Maryland, and George Mason University.
She was writer in residence at American University.
She won the Rosenthal Award of the American Academy of Arts and Letters and the James Jones First Novel Award. 
She is on the board of the PEN/Faulkner Foundation. 
She lives in Washington, D.C.

Works
Man Alive! Farrar, Straus and Giroux. 2013. .

References

External links

Author's website
"Off the Page", The Washington Post, May 12, 2005
"Mary Kay Zuravleff", Key West Literary Seminar, November 27, 2007

Living people
American women short story writers
American women novelists
Writers from Washington, D.C.
Rice University alumni
Johns Hopkins University faculty
Goucher College faculty and staff
University of Maryland, College Park faculty
George Mason University faculty
American University faculty and staff
21st-century American novelists
1960 births
21st-century American women writers
21st-century American short story writers
Novelists from Virginia
Novelists from Maryland
American women academics